Pigeon Hill may refer to:

United States
Pigeon Hill (New York), an elevation in Otsego County, New York
Pigeon Hill, Clarke County, Virginia
Pigeon Hill, Essex County, Virginia, Essex County, Virginia

Canada
Pigeon Hill, New Brunswick, a local service district in Gloucester County
Pigeon Hill (St. Armand), former village that is now part of the municipality of Saint-Armand, Quebec